Police Report (German: Der Polizeifunk meldet) is a 1939 German crime thriller film directed by Rudolf van der Noss and starring Lola Müthel, Hans Zesch-Ballot and Erich Fiedler. It was shot at the Babelsberg Studios in Berlin. The film's sets were designed by the art directors Heinrich Beisenherz and Alfred Bütow. It was produced and distributed by Terra Film.

Synopsis
Two men attempting industrial espionage on a new chemical invention become caught up in a murder case for which they have no alibi.

Cast
 Lola Müthel as Inge Flint, Cheflaborantin
 Hans Zesch-Ballot as Benken, Kriminalkommissar
 Erich Fiedler as 	Erich Wiesneck
 Jaspar von Oertzen as 	Dr. Berthold Mahr
 Albert Lippert as Harry Hornemann, Kaufmann
 Hans Stiebner as 	Tesch, Penionsinhaber
 Herbert Gernot as 	Berg, Kriminalsekretär
 Roma Bahn as Frau Duval, Modehausbesitzerin
 Elsa Wagner as 	Frau Kapland, Vermieterin
 Lotte Rausch as Grete, Dienstmädchen
 Jack Trevor as 	Percy Duffins
 Werner Pledath as 	Dieffenbach, Kriminalrat
 F.W. Schröder-Schrom as 	Mahr, Kommerzienrat 
 Bruno Fritz as 	Müller, Kriminalsekretär
 Otto Matthies as 	Hebert Timm / Faber / Ganove

References

Bibliography 
 Giesen, Rolf. The Nosferatu Story: The Seminal Horror Film, Its Predecessors and Its Enduring Legacy. McFarland, 2019.
 Klaus, Ulrich J. Deutsche Tonfilme: Jahrgang 1939. Klaus-Archiv, 1988.
 Rentschler, Eric. The Ministry of Illusion: Nazi Cinema and Its Afterlife. Harvard University Press, 1996.

External links 
 

1939 films
Films of Nazi Germany
German crime thriller films
1939 crime films
1930s crime thriller films
1930s German-language films
Terra Film films
Films based on German novels
1930s German films
Films shot at Babelsberg Studios